The Canadian federal budget for fiscal year 1979-1980 was presented by Minister of Finance Jean Chrétien in the House of Commons of Canada on 16 November 1978.

External links 

 Budget Speech
 Budget Papers
 Budget in Brief

References

1978, November
Federal budget, November
Canada, November
Federal budget, November